L'Atlantide is a 1932 German-French adventure and fantasy film directed by G. W. Pabst and starring Brigitte Helm. It is based on the novel L'Atlantide by Pierre Benoît.

Production
The film is a remake of the 1921 film of the same name directed by Jacques Feyder. After Feyder refused to create a sound remake of L'Atlantide, Pabst took to directing the film. Both Pabst and Feyder's film adaptations were shot in the Sahara Desert. To compete with American films, the film was shot in three languages: English, French and German.

Cast

References

Notes

External links

1932 films
1932 adventure films
1930s English-language films
1930s German-language films
1930s French-language films
1932 multilingual films
German multilingual films
French multilingual films
Films of the Weimar Republic
French adventure films
German adventure films
French black-and-white films
German black-and-white films
Films directed by G. W. Pabst
Films based on Atlantida
Remakes of French films
Sound film remakes of silent films
Films set in deserts
Films produced by Seymour Nebenzal
1930s French films
1930s German films